The Campori Madonna is an oil on panel painting, attributed to the painter Vincenzo Rasori to Antonio da Correggio.

History
It now hangs in the Galleria Estense in Modena, to which it was left by Marchese Giuseppe Campori in 1894. It is unknown who commissioned it, but prior to 1894, it had been in a chapel at Soliera Castle near Mantua, which was part of the Campori estates from 1636 onwards.

Description 
It can be stylistically dated to c.1517-1518, around the same time as Correggio's Madonna and Child with the Infant John the Baptist and his production of the frescoes in the Camera di San Paolo. It shows Correggio moving away from the influence of Leonardo da Vinci and towards that of Raphael, particularly the latter artist's Madonna of Foligno and Tempi Madonna.

References

Campori
1518 paintings
Paintings in the collection of the Galleria Estense